Robert Pickering may refer to:

 Robert Hugh Pickering (1932–2015), Canadian farmer, curler and political figure in Saskatchewan
 Robert Young Pickering (1849–1931), British industrialist